Mount Stromlo (formerly Mount Strom ) is a mountain with an elevation of   that is situated in the Australian Capital Territory, Australia. The mountain is most notable as the location of the Mount Stromlo Observatory. The mountain forms part of the catchment area of the Cotter River which in turn is the primary water supply for part of ACT.

Geology

The rock on Mount Stromlo consists of ignimbrite from the Laidlaw Volcanics. This erupted in the upper Silurian period over the top of the Deakin Volcanics rhyodacite which is visible on the surface on the lower slopes in the east and southeast sides. The northern lower slopes are covered with a calcareous shale which is included in the Laidlaw Volcanics as it was deposited at the same time. A spur fault heads off east from the Winslade Fault to under the Scrivener Dam. On the northwest and north side of these faults are middle Silurian period rhyodacite volcanic deposits from the Walker Volcanics. The northern side was uplifted compared with the southern side.

The name Stromlo is taken from the poems of Ossian.

Landform
Stoney Creek and its tributaries drain the north side of the mountain, The east side drains into the Molonglo River. The south side supplies Blugar Creek that runs into the Murrumbidgee River.

The summit of the mountain where the telescopes are located is elongated in a north–south direction, with a spur running to the southwest where the water treatment plant is situated.

Observatory history

The first telescope installed at Mount Stromlo was the Oddie telescope which was installed on 8 September 1911. The building housing this telescope was the first construction funded by the Commonwealth Government in Canberra. In January 1913 the first telephone was connected to the Queanbeyan telephone exchange.

Mount Stromlo was devastated by the Canberra bushfires of 2003. The fire, fueled by the pine plantation that covered the mountain, destroyed or badly damaged much of the observatory and water treatment plant.

Road access is via the Cotter Road on the south side, and Uriarra Road on the east and north.  The summit is reached by a road joining Cotter Road just outside .

Mountain biking
Mount Stromlo is home to one of the finest and most well equipped mountain biking facilities in Australia. Prior to the 2003 bushfires, Mount Stromlo hosted some of the best and oldest mountain bike trails in Australia. In May 2006 extensive remedial work and trail reconstruction was commenced by World Trail in partnership with Canberra Off-Road Cyclists mountain bike club and the ACT Government.

Mount Stromlo hosted the 2009 UCI Mountain Bike & Trials World Championships that attracted more than  visitors from up to 40 countries. The event involved more than 750 of the world's top riders who competed in the four mountain bike disciplines of Cross Country, Downhill, Four Cross and Observed Trials.

In addition to the mountain biking facilities Mount Stromlo also boasts an event pavilion with office space and change rooms, a kids play area, BBQs, a road cycling criterium circuit, a groomed grass cross country running track and equestrian trails.

References

External links
 Stromlo Forest Park website

Mountains of the Australian Capital Territory
Volcanoes of the Australian Capital Territory
Silurian volcanism